Gallaecia, also known as Hispania Gallaecia, was the name of a Roman province in the north-west of Hispania, approximately present-day Galicia, northern Portugal, Asturias and Leon and the later Kingdom of Gallaecia. The Roman cities included the port Cale (Porto), the governing centers Bracara Augusta (Braga), Lucus Augusti (Lugo) and Asturica Augusta (Astorga) and their administrative areas Conventus bracarensis, Conventus lucensis and Conventus asturicensis.

Description 
The Romans named the northwest part of Hispania or the Iberian Peninsula Gallaecia after the celtic tribes of the area the Gallaeci or Gallaecians.

The Gallaic make their entry into written history in the first-century epic Punica of Silius Italicus on the First Punic War:

Fibrarum et pennae divinarumque sagacem
flammarum misit dives Callaecia pubem,
barbara nunc patriis ululantem carmina linguis,
nunc pedis alterno percussa verbere terra,
ad numerum resonas gaudentem plaudere caetras. (book III.344-7)

"Rich Gallaecia sent its youths, wise in the knowledge of divination by the entrails of beasts, by feathers and flames— who, now crying out the barbarian song of their native tongue, now alternately stamping the ground in their rhythmic dances until the ground rang, and accompanying the playing with sonorous caetrae" (a caetra was a small type of shield used in the region).

Gallaecia, as a region, was thus marked for the Romans as much for the Gallaeci's castros, a system of hillforts, as was for the lure of its gold mines. This culture extended over present day Galicia, the north of Portugal, the western part of Asturias, the Bierzo, and Sanabria and was distinct from the neighbouring Lusitanian culture to the south according to the classical authors Pomponius Mela and Pliny the Elder.

At a far later date, the mythic history that was encapsulated in Lebor Gabála Érenn credited Gallaecia as the point from which the Gaels sailed to conquer Ireland, as they had Gallaecia, by force of arms.

History

Pre-Roman Gallaecia 
Strabo in his Geography lists the people of the northwestern Atlantic coast of Iberia as follows:

...then the Vettonians and the Vaccaeans, through whose territory the Durius [Douro] River flows, which affords a crossing at Acutia, a city of the Vaccaeans; and last, the Callaicans, [Gallaicans] who occupy a very considerable part of the mountainous country. For this reason, since they were very hard to fight with, the Callaicans themselves have not only furnished the surname for the man who defeated the Lusitanians [meaning Decimus Junius Brutus Callaicus, Roman general] but they have also brought it about that now, already, the most of the Lusitanians are called Callaicans.

Roman Gallaecia 

After the Punic Wars, the Romans turned their attention to conquering Hispania. The tribe of the Gallaeci 60,000 strong, according to Paulus Orosius, faced the Roman forces in 137 BC in a battle at the river Douro, which resulted in a great Roman victory, by virtue of which the Roman proconsul Decimus Junius Brutus returned a hero, receiving the agnomen Gallaicus ("conqueror of the Gallaicoi"). From this time, Gallaic fighters joined the Roman legions, to serve as far away as Dacia and Britain. The final extinction of Celtic resistance was the aim of the violent and ruthless Cantabrian Wars fought under the Emperor Augustus from 26 to 19 BC. The resistance was appalling: collective suicide rather than surrender, mothers who killed their children before committing suicide, crucified prisoners of war who sang triumphant hymns, rebellions of captives who killed their guards and returned home from Gaul.

For Rome Gallaecia was a region formed exclusively by two conventus—the Lucensis and the Bracarensis—and was distinguished clearly from other zones like the Asturica, according to written sources:

Legatus iuridici to per ASTURIAE ET GALLAECIAE.
Procurator ASTURIAE ET GALLAECIAE.
Cohors ASTURUM ET GALLAECORUM.
Pliny:  ASTURIA ET GALLAECIA

In the 3rd century, Diocletian created an administrative division which included the conventus of Gallaecia, Asturica and, perhaps, Cluniense. This province took the name of Gallaecia since Gallaecia was the most populous and important zone within the province. In 409, as Roman control collapsed, the Suebi conquests transformed Roman Gallaecia (convents Lucense and Bracarense) into the kingdom of Galicia (the Galliciense Regnum recorded by Hydatius and Gregory of Tours).

Roman governors 
 Aconius Catullinus Philomatius, praeses before 338

Later Gallaecia 

On the night of 31 December 406 AD, several Germanic barbarian tribes, the Vandals, Alans, and Suebi, swept over the Roman frontier on the Rhine. They advanced south, pillaging Gaul, and crossed the Pyrenees. They set about dividing up the Roman provinces of Carthaginiensis, Tarraconensis, Gallaecia, and Baetica. The Suebi took part of Gallaecia, where they later established a kingdom. After the Vandals and Alans left for North Africa, the Suebi took control of much of the Iberian Peninsula. However, Visigothic campaigns took much of this territory back. The Visigoths emerged victorious in the wars that followed, and eventually annexed Gallaecia.

After the Visigothic defeat and the annexation of much of Hispania by the Moors, a group of Visigothic states survived in the northern mountains, including Gallaecia. In Beatus of Liébana (d. 798), Gallaecia became used to refer to the Christian part of the Iberian peninsula, whereas Hispania was used for the Muslim one. The emirs found it not worth their while to conquer these mountains filled with warlike tribes and lacking oil or wine.

In Charlemagne's time, bishops of Gallaecia attended the Council of Frankfurt in 794. During his residence in Aachen, he received embassies from Alfonso II of Gallaecia, according to the Frankish chronicles.

Sancho III of Navarre in 1029 refers to Bermudo III of León as Imperator domus Vermudus in Gallaecia.

See also 

 Gallaecian language
 Pre-Roman peoples of the Iberian Peninsula
 Kingdom of Galicia
 Timeline of Galician history
 Romanization of Hispania
 Gaelic

References

Bibliography 
 Coutinhas, José Manuel (2006), Aproximação à identidade etno-cultural dos Callaeci Bracari, Porto.

External links 
 Alfonso Carbonell Lombardero, "The Gaels in Gallaecia_1.00"
 Alfonso Carbonell Lombardero, "The Gaels in Gallaecia"
 Luís Magarinhos Igrejas, "Sobre a origem e significado das palavras Portugal e Galiza"
 Detailed map of the Pre-Roman Peoples of Iberia (around 200 BC)
 Rutas Arqueolóxicas do Eixo Atlántico – Roteiro Arqueológico do Eixo Atlântico

 
Late Roman provinces
History of Galicia (Spain)
States and territories established in the 3rd century